El Madher is a town in north-eastern Batna.

Communes of Batna Province
Batna Province